Harry W. Frantz (November 5, 1891 – April 26, 1982) was an international editor and correspondent for the Washington Bureau of United Press International for more than four decades.

Early career
He was born in Cerro Gordo, Illinois and attended Stanford University from 1913-1919.  He was an international correspondent for United Press International from 1917 to 1965.  In 1923 he was appointed Director of Publicity for Yellowstone National Park and gave the park’s Grand Loop Road its name.

Government career
From 1941 to 1944 he served as the Press Director for the Office of the Coordinator of Inter-American Affairs with the U.S. Department of State, and from 1944 to 1945 he was the Information Officer to the Assistant Secretary of State for American Republics.

References

External links

 Papers of Harry W. Frantz, Dwight D. Eisenhower Presidential Library

1891 births
1982 deaths
American newspaper editors
American newspaper reporters and correspondents
Maria Moors Cabot Prize winners
People from Piatt County, Illinois
Journalists from Illinois
20th-century American journalists
American male journalists